I, Monster is a 1971 British horror film directed by Stephen Weeks (his feature debut) for Amicus Productions. It is an adaptation of Robert Louis Stevenson's 1886 novella Strange Case of Dr. Jekyll and Mr. Hyde, with the main characters' names changed to Dr. Charles Marlowe and Mr. Edward Blake.

Plot
Psychologist Charles Marlowe (Lee) invents a drug which will release his patients' inhibitions. When he tests it on himself, he becomes the evil Edward Blake, who descends into crime and eventually murder.  Utterson (Cushing), Marlowe's lawyer, believes that Blake is blackmailing his friend until he discovers the truth.

Cast
 Christopher Lee as Marlowe / Blake
 Peter Cushing as Utterson
 Mike Raven as Enfield
 Richard Hurndall as Lanyon
 George Merritt as Poole
 Kenneth J. Warren as Deane
 Susan Jameson as Diane 
 Marjie Lawrence as Annie
 Aimée Delamain as Landlady (as Aimee Delamain)
 Michael Des Barres as Boy in Alley

Production
It stars Christopher Lee as the doctor and his alter ego, and Peter Cushing as Frederick Utterson, a central character in Stevenson's original story. Mike Raven and Susan Jameson also star. It was photographed by Moray Grant, with music by Carl Davis.

Peter Duffell, who had previously worked for Amicus, was offered the movie to direct, but turned it down. Financing came from British Lion and the NFFC.

It was intended to be shown in 3-D utilizing the Pulfrich effect, but the idea was abandoned upon release.

Reception
The film performed poorly at the box office, however recent reviews have praised the film for its faithful direction from the source material with Drew Hunt of Chicago Reader listing it as one of Christopher Lee's five best roles.

Differences from the source material
Apart from changing the names for the character Henry Jekyll/ Edward Hyde to Charles Marlowe/ Edward Blake, as well as changing the character to a Freudian psychotherapist instead of a doctor, the story is fairly faithful to the original novella. The final act is changed, however. In the original novella, Utterson and Poole smashes Jekyll's door to find the body of Hyde dead by suicide, after Jekyll has failed to keep Hyde in check. In the film, Blake kills Poole for fearing that he would divulge his secret, and goes on to fight Utterson, whom however resists, and accidentally kills Blake by pushing him down the stairs. Blake's face transforms into Marlowe's while Utterson and his maid stare in shock.

References

Sources

External links 

I, Monster at BFI Screenonline

1971 films
1971 horror films
1970s British films
1970s English-language films
British horror films
British Lion Films films
Dr. Jekyll and Mr. Hyde films
Films directed by Stephen Weeks
Films scored by Carl Davis